Vrajlal Kalidas Shastri was a pioneer of philology in Gujarati language and writer who wrote books on Gujarati language.

Life
He was born on 26 November 1825 in Malataj, a village in Petlad, Gujarat. He took his primary education in his village Malataj. He had studied Sanskrit poetry and grammar in Sanskrit pathshalas. He also studied Prakrit grammar and literature. He taught Sanskrit at Jain Mandir, Ahmedabad. Due to Jain religious books, he became familiar with Prakrit-Pali, Apabhramsa, Ardha Magadhi so he wrote books on philology of Gujarati. He worked with Gujarat Vernacular Society and Dharma Sabha and edited their two journals, Buddhiprakash and Dharmaprakash. He had a long career of twenty five years as a researcher and scholar.

He died on 14 November 1892.

Works
He had written fifteen books. His books on Gujarati language include Gujarati Bhashano Itihas (1866), Utsargmala (1870), Gurjar Bhasha Prakash (1892). His Utsargama is a pioneer work in philology of Gujarati. He also compiled, with J. V. S. Taylor, Dhatusangraha (1870), an etymological dictionary of Gujarati roots.

His Rasganga is a work on poetics. Chandrahas Akhyana and Muktamala are his other creative works. Yagnavalkyacharit is a biography of sage Yajnavalkya in a dialogue form which is an only biography in such form in Gujarati. Hitopadesh Shabdartha (1870) and Vaisheshik Tarksaar (1898; posthumously) are also his significant works.

References

Indian male poets
Poets from Gujarat
Gujarati-language writers
Gujarati-language poets
19th-century Indian biographers
1825 births
1892 deaths
Indian editors
Indian philologists
People from Anand district
19th-century Indian poets
19th-century Indian male writers
19th-century Indian linguists
Male biographers